Nemadoras humeralis is a species of thorny catfish native to the Amazon basin where it can be found in Bolivia, Brazil, Colombia and Peru.  This species grows to a length of  SL.

References

Further reading
 

Doradidae
Fish of Bolivia
Freshwater fish of Brazil
Freshwater fish of Colombia
Freshwater fish of Peru
Fish of the Amazon basin
Fish described in 1855
Taxa named by Rudolf Kner